O'Neil Bryan (born 1975), better known by his stage name Elephant Man, is a Jamaican dancehall musician, having formerly been a member of the dancehall group Scare Dem Crew prior to his solo career.

Career
He started out his musical career in 1995 as a member of the Scare Dem Crew, later continuing as a solo artist. He was later characterised for several trademarks, such as his dyed yellow-orange hair, his unique low-key voice, and his stage performance, which included jumping and running, or even climbing on stage props and monitors. His acoustic trademark is a low, raspy grumble singing voice and light lisp.

Bryan had his first international recognition when he and Puma settled a contract for using his single "All Out" for its Olympics commercial campaign in 2004.

His song "Willie Bounce" appeared on several mixtapes in early 2006. It used the first few bars from "I Will Survive" by Gloria Gaynor. "Willie Bounce" has been described as one of Elephant Man's most recognisable songs, with the corresponding dance still enjoying popularity as of 2015.

Bryan signed with New York-based label Bad Boy Records and released Let's Get Physical on 6 November 2007. The first single was called "Five-O" and featured Wyclef Jean. Another track on the album featured Diddy and Busta Rhymes, and it was produced by Cipha Sounds and Solitair.

Many of Elephant Man's songs are found on various Riddim Driven albums by VP Records and Greensleeves Records's Rhythm Album series. He performed on popular riddims such as "Diwali", "Coolie", "Stepz", and "Bubble Up".

The Gully Creeper dance, for which Bryan created a song, was danced by Usain Bolt at the 2008 Summer Olympics in Beijing after winning the gold medal and breaking a world record in the 200 meter sprint.

In 2009, Elephant Man released a cover of the song "We Are The World" in tribute to Michael Jackson.

Legal issues
Bryan has been criticised for his lyrics calling for violence against gay people. In 2003, British LGBT group OutRage! called for the arrest and prosecution of several dancehall stars including Elephant Man, Bounty Killer and Beenie Man for violation of hate crimes statutes. In 2004, he was dropped from the MOBO awards. Since then pressure from his record company and agreement with gay rights groups to avoid songs with lyrics deemed to incite homophobic violence have allowed him to perform in the UK. In 2009, his scheduled appearance at Toronto's Caribana festival was cancelled for similar reasons. A concert in Munich was cancelled in February 2015 after LGBT rights groups had asked the police to make sure he would not perform songs which call upon people to murder gays.

In January 2012, Bryan was arrested and charged with the rape and grievous sexual assault of a 31-year-old woman who accused him of assaulting her in his home in St. Andrew. In February 2016, the case was dropped due to the death of the complainant.

In March 2020, Jamaican authorities charged Elephant Man after it was alleged that he intentionally failed to declare his travel to Germany in order to avoid being quarantined in efforts to prevent the spread of the COVID-19 pandemic from countries that were on a restricted travel list.  Elephant Man later apologised for the incident.

Discography

Albums 
 2000: Comin' 4 You
 2001: Log On
 2002: Higher Level
 2003: Good 2 Go
 2007: Monsters of Dancehall
 2008: Let's Get Physical
 2011: Dance & Sweep
 TBA: Out of Control

Video game appearances
Elephant Man is a playable character in the 2004 video game Def Jam: Fight for NY.

References

External links

 
 Interview 11 April 2007 on BBC Radio 1Xtra; 64 minutes. (RealPlayer)

Jamaican dancehall musicians
Jamaican reggae musicians
Reggae fusion artists
Living people
Musicians from Kingston, Jamaica
Bad Boy Records artists
Atlantic Records artists
1975 births
VP Records artists
Greensleeves Records artists